Ethelda Marguerite Bleibtrey (February 27, 1902 – May 6, 1978), also known by her married name Ethelda Schlatke, was an American competition swimmer, three-time Olympic gold medalist, and former world record-holder in multiple events.

Bleibtrey was a dominant backstroke swimmer, but entered and won gold medals in three freestyle events when there were no women's backstroke events at the 1920 Summer Olympics in Antwerp, Belgium. She won a gold medal as member of the winning U.S. team in the women's 4×100-meter freestyle relay, together with teammates Margaret Woodbridge, Frances Schroth and Irene Guest. The American relay team set a new world record of 5:11.6 in the event final. Individually, Bleibtrey also received gold medals and set world records in the women's 100-meter freestyle (1:13.6) and the women's 300-meter freestyle (4:34.0).

She was born in Waterford, New York, to John and Maggie Bleibtrey. She started swimming to help recover from polio, which she contracted in 1917. In 1919, she was arrested for "nude swimming" — she removed her stockings at a pool where it was forbidden to bare "the lower female extremities for public bathing." The subsequent public support for Bleibtrey led to the abandonment of stockings as a conventional element in women's swimwear.

Bleibtrey was inducted into the International Swimming Hall of Fame as an "Honor Swimmer" in 1967. She died in West Palm Beach, Florida, in 1978.

See also
 List of members of the International Swimming Hall of Fame
 List of multiple Olympic gold medalists
 List of Olympic medalists in swimming (women)
 World record progression 100 metres freestyle
 World record progression 400 metres freestyle
 World record progression 4 × 100 metres freestyle relay

References

Bibliography
 Floyd Conner, The Olympic's Most Wanted: The Top 10 Book of Gold Medal Gaffes, Improbable Triumphs, and Other Oddities, Brassey's (2002). .

External links

 
 

1902 births
1978 deaths
American female freestyle swimmers
World record setters in swimming
Medalists at the 1920 Summer Olympics
Olympic gold medalists for the United States in swimming
People from Waterford, New York
Swimmers at the 1920 Summer Olympics
20th-century American women
20th-century American people